Wyalkatchem is a town in the central Wheatbelt region,  east-north-east of Perth,  east of Dowerin and  south of Koorda.

The town won the state tidy town award in 2000 and 2002, and then won the national award in 2003.

History
Wyalkatchem is an Aboriginal name first recorded for a waterhole, spelt Walkatching in the 1870s. The spelling Walcatching was used in 1881 when the Toodyay Road Board referred to a tank to be built there, and when the road from Northam to the Yilgarn Goldfield was surveyed in 1892 the spelling Wyalcatchem was used for the tank. The Walkatching spelling is probably the most accurate, as Aboriginal names in this region rarely end in em. The change of spelling from Wyalcatchem to Wyalkatchem in 1911 was done by the Department of Lands & Surveys according to rules the department had adopted for spelling Aboriginal names. The meaning of the name is not known.

In 1932 the Wheat Pool of Western Australia announced that the town would have two grain elevators, each fitted with an engine, installed at the railway siding.

When the extension of the railway east from Dowerin was planned in 1908 land was set aside for a future townsite in the area of the Wyalcatchem tank. The route of the railway and site for a station was not fixed until 1910, and action followed to then fix the position of the townsite and survey town lots. Following the survey of the lots the townsite was gazetted spelt Wyalkatchem in 1911.

When the railway from Dowerin opened in February 1911, Wyalkatchem was a minor siding only, but its importance grew when it was selected as the turnout point for a branch line leading north and then east to the Mount Marshall district. Thus a small village quickly blossomed on the town site. The branch line to Bencubbin opened on 1 February 1915 and the line from Dowerin was extended to Merredin in August 1911.

A bioblitz was conducted in 2012 in a bush reserve between Korrelocking and Wyalkatchem. 54 people took part and collected samples of scorpions, pseudoscorpions, isopods, spiders and centipedes, including some new species.

Commercial area
The extensive railway barracks in town are leased by the shire council from the Western Australian Government Railways Commission. The barracks represent one of the few intact examples of its kind in Australia and are currently used as accommodation during Dowerin Field Days and as the headquarters of a hang-gliding club.

The area is home to a Cooperative Bulk Handling receival point that can hold nearly 120,000 tonnes of grain and crops; the primary industries in the area are wheat and sheep farming. The town also supports a gypsum mine that is situated just outside town at Lake Cowcowing.

In 2013 Wyalkatchem hosted the inaugural Racewars event, organised by The Racewars Group. The event saw 200 competitors and over 3000 spectators witness some of Western Australia's fastest vehicles race head-to-head and against the clock on the 1500m airstrip at the Wyalkatchem airport. After the success of the inaugural event, Wyalkatchem has agreed to host the event for another five years.

Climate

References

External links

Shire of Wyalkatchem

Towns in Western Australia
Wheatbelt (Western Australia)
Grain receival points of Western Australia